The 166th Massachusetts General Court, consisting of the Massachusetts Senate and the Massachusetts House of Representatives, met in 1969 and 1970 during the governorship of Francis Sargent. Maurice A. Donahue served as president of the Senate and David M. Bartley served as speaker of the House.

Senators

Representatives

See also
 1970 Massachusetts gubernatorial election
 91st United States Congress
 List of Massachusetts General Courts

References

Further reading

External links

 
 
 
 
  (1964-1994)

Political history of Massachusetts
Massachusetts legislative sessions
massachusetts
1969 in Massachusetts
massachusetts
1970 in Massachusetts